Antonio Junior Vacca (born 13 May 1990) is an Italian professional footballer who plays as a defensive midfielder for  club Foggia.

Club career
Vacca made his Serie C debut for Benevento on 31 January 2010 in a game against Arezzo.

On 16 July 2019, Vacca signed a 3-year contract with Venezia. Vacca's contract with Venezia was terminated by mutual consent on 8 September 2022.

On 19 January 2023, Vacca returned to Foggia on a 1.5-year contract.

Personal life 
On 26 January 2019, Vacca was a victim of a robbery by two criminals who tried to steal his jewels, however, they were not able to take the jewels, but his car was damaged by a gunshot; Vacca was not harmed.

References

External links
 

1990 births
Footballers from Naples
Living people
Italian footballers
Association football midfielders
Italy youth international footballers
Benevento Calcio players
A.S.D. Barletta 1922 players
U.S. Livorno 1915 players
U.S. Catanzaro 1929 players
A.C. Reggiana 1919 players
Calcio Foggia 1920 players
Parma Calcio 1913 players
Casertana F.C. players
Venezia F.C. players
Serie A players
Serie B players
Serie C players